OELib was an Open Source Cheminformatics library. Its actual GPLed C++ and Java successors are OpenBabel and JOELib. Its commercial successor is called OEChem.

See also
 JOELib
 OpenBabel

External links 
 Archived copy of OELib in 2008 on Internet Archive.
 Design flaws in OELib

Free science software
Chemistry software for Linux